BCIT stands for British Columbia Institute of Technology, a public polytechnic institution in Burnaby, British Columbia, Canada.

BCIT may also refer to:
Burlington County Institute of Technology
BC Rail (reporting mark)
Bahen Centre for Information Technology at the University of Toronto